Detwiler is a surname. Notable people with the surname include:

Andrea Detwiler, American costume designer
Andy Detwiler (1969–2022), American farmer
Chuck Detwiler (born 1947), American football player
Jason Detwiler (born 1975), American opera singer
Jim Detwiler (born 1945), American football player
Larry Detwiler, American television director
Michele Detwiler (born 1976), American opera singer
Ross Detwiler (born 1986), American baseball player

See also
Deadwyler